Anadia antioquensis is a species of lizard in the family Gymnophthalmidae. It is endemic to Colombia and has been recorded in the Antioquia and Caldas Departments.

References

Anadia (genus)
Reptiles of Colombia
Endemic fauna of Colombia
Reptiles described in 2013
Taxa named by Juan Camilo Arredondo Salgar